Enoggera Hill is a small mountain of the Taylor Range in Australia in the Brisbane suburb of Enoggera, in Queensland,  with a peak of 273 meters (896 feet) above sea level.

Enoggera Hill is close to Mount Coot-tha and like this peak, it is mostly covered by bushland. The hill is located within the grounds of the Enoggera Barracks.

The hill's coordinates are:

 Latitude:  27° 25' 44.3" (27.429°) south
 Longitude:  152° 57' 33.8" (152.9594°) east

See also

Enoggera

References

Mountains of South East Queensland
Geography of Brisbane
Enoggera, Queensland